(April 1, 1928 – December 26, 2011) was a prominent Japanese architect known as one of the founders of the Japanese Metabolist group. He was also the tutor and employer of several important Japanese architects, such as Toyo Ito, Shōzō Uchii and Itsuko Hasegawa.

Background
Kikutake was born in 1928 in Kurume, Japan and graduated from Waseda University in 1950.

Career
Kikutake is best known for his "Marine City" project of 1958, which formed part of the Metabolist Manifesto launched at the World Design Conference in Tokyo in 1960 under the leadership of Kenzo Tange. He, along with fellow member Kisho Kurokawa was invited to exhibit work at the "Visionary Architecture" exhibition in New York of 1961, through which the Metabolists gained international recognition. Kikutake continued his practice until his death in 2011, producing several key public buildings throughout Japan, as well as lecturing internationally. He was also the President and then Honorary President of the Japan Institute of Architects.

Awards
Kikutake was the recipient of numerous awards both in his native Japan and internationally. These include the Japan Academy of Architecture Prize (1970) and the UIA (Union Internationale des Architectes) Auguste Perret Prize (1978).

List of works
Sky House, Tokyo, 1958
Marine City (proposal), 1958
Tatebayashi Civic Centre, Gumma, 1963
Administrative building of Izumo Shrine, Shimane, 1963
Pacific Hotel Chigasaki, Kanagawa, 1966
Miyakonojo Civic Hall, Miyazaki, 1966
Expo Tower, Expo '70, Osaka, 1969
Pasadena Heights, 1975
Matsumi Tower, Ibaraki, 1976
Tanabe Art Museum, Shimane, 1979
Hotel Seiyo Ginza, Tokyo, 1987
Edo-Tokyo Museum, Tokyo, 1993
Hotel Sofitel Tokyo, Tokyo, 1994
Kitaya Inari Shrine, Tokyo, 1997
Shimane Art Museum, Shimane, 1999
National Showa Memorial Museum, Tokyo, 1999
Kyushu National Museum, Fukuoka, 2005

References

Kisho Kurokawa, "The Origin and History of the Metabolist Movement" - Charles Jencks, Kisho Kurokawa. Studio Vista, 1976
Botond Bognar, "Beyond the Bubble: Contemporary Japanese Architecture" ; Phaidon, 2008

External links

K. Kikutake Architects
 Marine City, 1958

1928 births
2011 deaths
People from Fukuoka Prefecture
Japanese architects
Academic staff of Waseda University
Waseda University alumni
Recipients of the Order of the Rising Sun, 3rd class